The Joseph Horne Company, often referred to simply as Joseph Horne's or Horne's, was an iconic, regional department store chain based in Pittsburgh, Pennsylvania. The store was one of the oldest in the country being founded on February 22, 1849, but was often overlooked as it maintained only a regional presence. The chain ceased operations in 1994 after being merged with the Lazarus division of Federated Department Stores.

Founders
Joseph Horne (1826–1892) was born in Bedford County, Pennsylvania, the son of John Horn and Catherine Otto, grandson of Henry Horn, who had served in the Continental Army. Joseph  moved three counties west to Pittsburgh and found his first job in the retail trade with Christian Yeager, the father of South Fork Fishing and Hunting Club member H. C. Yeager. Soon, Joseph moved to the F.H. Eaton store, and became a partner. He bought the business in 1849, at age 23, renaming it The Joseph Horne Company. He joined forces with Christian B. Shea and A. P. Burchfield, whose families intermarried and entered the business. 

In 1881, the firm built its new building designed by Charles Tattersall Ingham at Wood and Liberty. In 1891, at age 65, Horne sold the wholesale side of his company's operations to the Pittsburgh Dry Goods Company. He married twice — first to Mary Elizabeth Shea, later to Emma Galway — and sired numerous children. His son Durbin Horne, born in 1854, was among Horne's children who followed their father into the family business. Both Joseph and Durbin Horne were members of the area's elite South Fork Fishing and Hunting Club. Joseph Horne died in 1892.

Christian Bernard Shea (1835–1900) was the brother-in-law of Joseph Horne, and his founding partner in The Joseph Horne Company. Shea was involved with both halves of the family business — retail (Joseph Horne Co. Department Store) and wholesale (Pittsburgh Dry Goods Company). Shea was also member of South Fork Fishing and Hunting Club, whose defective dam, altered to benefit the Club, caused thousands of deaths during 1889's Johnstown Flood.

History 

Soon after Horne bought the Eaton Co., the Joseph Horne Company became a leading Pittsburgh department store. In 1879, he constructed a new central location at Penn Avenue and Stanwix Street in Downtown Pittsburgh, a seven-story landmark which was the first department store in the city's downtown. The building still stands to this day and several Horne's signs remain on the building as they do at the former Pittsburgh rival Kaufmann's on Smithfield Street.

In 1966, Associated Dry Goods (ADG) acquired Horne's, and ADG expanded operations of Horne's to several stores in suburban malls throughout the Pittsburgh region as well as in Erie, Pennsylvania and Northeast Ohio. In December 1986, Horne's was acquired by a local investor group following ADG's acquisition by May Department Stores. The local buyout was part of May's divesting of the Horne's chain, since May was already the owner of cross-town rival Kaufmann's.

Two years later, the Arkansas-based department store chain Dillard's and Edward J. DeBartolo Sr. agreed to acquire Horne's, with plans of combining it with another recent acquisition for Dillard's — the Ohio-based Higbee's store chain. The deal was canceled abruptly, resulting in several years of litigation.  Dillard's eventually agreed to acquire five Ohio Horne's stores as part of a legal settlement in 1992.

In 1994, Federated Department Stores acquired the remaining ten Horne's stores and merged them with its Lazarus division, completely ceasing all operations of any store under the Horne's name by August 29, 1994. This caused some anger among Pittsburgh shoppers, as Horne's was the oldest store in the city and had been a 145-year-old Pittsburgh tradition. After its closure the company was often praised for surviving 145 years with only a maximum of 15 stores. Several former Horne's locations operating as Lazarus closed in 1998. Those that remained eventually became "Lazarus-Macy's" and in 2006 were joined with Kaufmann's in the nationwide Macy's consolidation.

Flagship store

The flagship Horne's Department Store in Pittsburgh was the city's first department store, and remained its only one until the founding of Kaufmann's in 1871.  The L-shaped structure is actually three buildings built over the course of time. The first, is six-stories facing Penn Avenue and constructed in 1892. A six-story expansion was added to the west in 1897, followed by a seven-story addition in 1922. The store had four entrances — two on Stanwix Street, and two on Penn Avenue and contained  of selling space, making it the city's second largest department store. The store bore the Horne's name until August 29, 1994 when it became Lazarus. Lazarus only remained in the building for one year before closing the store and building a new location on Fifth Avenue. Oxford Development Co purchased the building with hopes of ground level retail while renting floors two through seven to Highmark Blue Cross Blue Shield. Old Navy opened  on the first two floors in 1996, but closed in 2003.  Highmark Blue Cross Blue Shield then purchased the structure and occupies the office space to this day with retail space at ground level.

Horne's Tree
The lighting of the Horne's Christmas tree at the flagship store was a long-held holiday season tradition. The six-story electric tree occupied a place on the corner of the building at Penn Avenue and Stanwix Street and viewers would crowd the area for a show and the lighting. Crowds also eagerly awaited the Christmas window displays at Horne's.  

The tree is still displayed annually in the tradition of Pittsburgh's Light Up Night at the Horne's building.

Left over Horne's
Several years after the closing of the last Horne's stores, several signs remain at the historic downtown flagship store building, each bearing the Horne's name. On the southwest corner of the building, two bronze plaques remain reading "Joseph Horne Co Dry Goods Importers and Retailers". Also, the frieze above the two entrances in the first structure reads "1849 – Joseph Horne Co. – 1879" marking the founding of the company and the year of construction, while the frieze of the 1922 addition bears that date. The sidewalk slabs adjoining the entrances have inlays of the Horne's logo.

Horne's and popular culture
Artist Andy Warhol worked at a Horne's location in the store's display department as a summer job in 1947.

The television series Twin Peaks referenced a fictional Horne's store and owner, Ben Joseph Horne, which were inspired by the real Horne's. Series co-creator Mark Frost attended Carnegie Mellon University in Pittsburgh.

Horne's also appeared in movies, including the Monroeville Mall location, which was shown in George A. Romero's 1978 movie Dawn of the Dead. The Pittsburgh flagship store was the site of the 1987 erotic thriller, Lady Beware, which starred Diane Lane as a window designer employed there. This was Horne's most notable appearance, as in addition to the location, the store's name appeared. Diane Lane's character worked at Horne's.

See also
List of defunct department stores of the United States

References

Defunct department stores based in Pittsburgh
Companies based in Pittsburgh
Defunct companies based in Pennsylvania
Pittsburgh History & Landmarks Foundation Historic Landmarks
American companies established in 1849
Retail companies established in 1849
1849 establishments in Pennsylvania
Retail companies disestablished in 1994
1994 disestablishments in Pennsylvania